Granite Island may refer to

Granite Island (South Australia), close to Victor Harbor, South Australia
Granite Island (Victoria), in Corner Inlet, to the north of Wilsons Promontory, Victoria, Australia
Granite Island (Michigan), USA
Any of several islands in Alaska, USA
Granite Island, book about Corsica by Dorothy Carrington